Lisa McAllister (born 21 November 1980) is a Scottish model and actress.

After starting her career as a model, her first acting role was in a 2000 Paul Angunawela short film called Carpet Garden Flowers. Her movie career started in earnest with the lead female role in a US direct-to-video action film, The Number One Girl, with Vinnie Jones and Pat Morita, in 2005.

McAllister also had a brief music career, as part of the duo Fenix, along with Kirsty Spence. The duo attempted to represent the United Kingdom in the Eurovision Song Contest 2003 with the song, "Do Anything for Your Love". The song reached the semifinal of A Song For Europe, but failed to reach the final.

After being active on television, including a regular role in Dream Team, she has appeared in several British paranormal and horror films. She returned to television in 2010 for a cameo as Anthea, Mycroft Holmes' assistant in Sherlock which was described by Caitlin Moran in The Times as "one of the deftest comedy cameos of the year". In 2010 she also appeared in a pictorial of the British FHM.

Acting career
Carpet Garden Flowers (2000) as Kate McAllister (Short)
The Number One Girl (2005) - Tatiana (direct to video)
The Dark Knight (2008) - Passenger
How I Learned To Love Richard Gere (short film) (2008) - Vanessa
How to Lose Friends & Alienate People (2008) - Sophie Maes' Assistant
The Rapture (2010) - Angel
Just for the Record (2010) - Rosie Frond
Devil's Playground (2010) - Kate
Dead Cert (2010) - Jen Christian
Killing Bono (2011) - Erika
Rush (2013) - BOAC Stewardess
Scar Tissue (2013) - Ruth Elliott
Robocroc (2013) - Jane

Television
Dream Team (2004–05) - Sofia Moxham
Sea of Souls (2006) - Isobel
Pumpkinhead: Ashes to Ashes (2006) - Dahlia Wallace
The Bill (2007) - Isabelle Klein
Sherlock - "A Study in Pink" (2010) - Anthea
Hardy Bucks (2011) - Svetlana Salmon
 The Fear (2012) - Donna
Sherlock - "The Empty Hearse" (2014) - Anthea
Drunk History - "Episode 1" (2015) - Lady-In-Waiting to Queen Victoria

References

External links

1980 births
Living people
Scottish female models
Scottish film actresses
Scottish television actresses
21st-century Scottish actresses